Hennessey may refer to:

Names
Hennessey, Irish surname

Places
 Hennessey, Oklahoma, United States
 Hennessey Formation, United States

Media and entertainment 
 Hennesey, a 1959–1962 television series 
 Crossing Hennessy, a 2009 Hong Kong film

Business and trade 
 Hennessey Performance Engineering, a sports car company

Vehicles 
 Hennessey Venom GT, a record-breaking sports car built by Hennessey
 Hennessey Venom F5
 Hennessey Monoplane

See also
 Hennessy (disambiguation)